The genus Bowenia includes two living and two fossil species of cycads in the family Stangeriaceae, sometimes placed in their own family Boweniaceae. They are entirely restricted to Australia. The two living species occur in Queensland. B. spectabilis grows in warm, wet, tropical rainforests, on protected slopes and near streams, primarily in the lowlands of the Wet Tropics Bioregion. However, it has a local form with serrate pinna margins that grows in rainforest, Acacia-dominated transition forest, and also Casuarina-dominated sclerophyll forest on the Atherton Tableland, where it is subject to periodic bushfire.  B. serrulata grows in sclerophyll forest and transition forest close to the Tropic of Capricorn.

Species

The fossil species Bowenia eocenica is known from deposits in a coal mine in Victoria, Australia, and B. papillosa is known from deposits in New South Wales. Both fossils are of Eocene age, and consist of leaflet fragments.

References

External links

Gymnosperm Database, Bowenia

 
Endemic flora of Australia
Cycadophyta of Australia
Flora of Queensland
Taxa named by Joseph Dalton Hooker